Eric Johnson (born April 30, 1976) is a former professional American football linebacker.

College career
Johnson played linebacker for the Nebraska Cornhuskers.

Professional career

NFL

Johnson played linebacker for eight seasons (2000–2007) for the Oakland Raiders, the Atlanta Falcons, and the Arizona Cardinals, in the National Football League.
Johnson blocked a punt and returned it for a touchdown in Super Bowl 37 the outcome of that was a 48-21 defeat to the Tampa Bay Buccaneers.

AFL
Johnson was signed as a free agent by the Georgia Force on February 19, 2007. He was re-signed by the Force on June 2, 2009.

References

External links
NFL stats at DatabaseFootball.com
AFL stats at Arenafan.com
Eric Johnson bio page at ArenaFootball.com

1976 births
Living people
American football linebackers
American football cornerbacks
Nebraska Cornhuskers football players
Oakland Raiders players
Atlanta Falcons players
Arizona Cardinals players
San Francisco 49ers players
New Orleans Saints players
Georgia Force players